The Romney Institute of Public Service and Ethics (Romney Institute) at Brigham Young University is a department within the Marriott School of Management. The school offers a master's degree in public administration through both pre-service and executive programs.

History
The Romney Institute of Public Service and Ethics was named in 1998 for three-term Michigan governor and United States Secretary of Housing and Urban Development George W. Romney.

Academics

Rankings and admissions
In the 2022 edition of the U.S. News Best Graduate School Rankings, the MPA Program ranked No. 48.

People

Faculty

Alumni

Carl Hernandez III, Professor, J. Reuben Clark Law School
Matt Salmon, U.S. Congressman, Arizona (2013-2017)
Paul M. Warner, U.S. Attorney, District of Utah (1998-2006), U.S. Magistrate Judge, District of Utah (2006–present)

References

External links
 Official Page of the Romney Institute

Romney Institute
Public policy schools
Educational institutions established in 1998
1998 establishments in Utah